A.J. Meerwald, later known as Clyde A. Phillips, is a restored dredging oyster schooner, whose home port is in the Bivalve section of Commercial Township in Cumberland County, New Jersey. The schooner was added to the National Register of Historic Places on November 7, 1995 for her significance in architecture, commerce, and maritime history. She became the state tall ship in 1998. Today, A.J. Meerwald is used by the Bayshore Center at Bivalve for onboard educational programs in the Delaware Bay, and at other ports in the New Jersey, Pennsylvania, and Delaware region.

History
On September 7, 1928, A.J. Meerwald was constructed and launched by Charles H. Stowman & Sons at the shipyard in Dorchester. She was one of hundreds of schooners built along South Jersey's Delaware Bay shore before the decline of the shipbuilding industry which coincided with the Great Depression. During World War II, she was commandeered under the War Powers Act and turned over to the U.S. Coast Guard for use as a fireboat. In 1947, she was returned to the Meerwald family, who then sold her to Clyde A. Phillips for use as an oyster dredge. In 1998, Governor Christine Todd Whitman proclaimed the schooner the "official tall ship" of New Jersey.

See also
 National Register of Historic Places listings in Cumberland County, New Jersey
List of schooners
List of museums in New Jersey

References

External links
 
 Bayshore Center at Bivalve

Commercial Township, New Jersey
Individual sailing vessels
Schooners of the United States
Symbols of New Jersey
Tall ships of the United States
1928 ships
National Register of Historic Places in Cumberland County, New Jersey
New Jersey Register of Historic Places
Oyster schooners
Ships built in New Jersey
Ships on the National Register of Historic Places in New Jersey